Bruce Allan Mildenhall (born 27 March 1953 in Box Hill, Melbourne) was an Australian politician and a member of the Victorian Legislative Assembly for the electoral district of Footscray.

Mildenhall was a youth worker, recreation officer and public servant before being elected to the Legislative Assembly for Footscray in October 1992. He held a number of shadow ministries until 1999 and was a parliamentary secretary until 2006.

Mildenhall retired from the Legislative Assembly at the 2006 state election.

References

1953 births
Living people
Politicians from Melbourne
Australian Labor Party members of the Parliament of Victoria
Members of the Victorian Legislative Assembly
21st-century Australian politicians
People from Box Hill, Victoria